Trial by media is a phrase popular in the late 20th century and early 21st century to describe the impact of television and newspaper coverage on a person's reputation by creating a widespread perception of guilt or innocence before, or after, a verdict in a court of law. It is particularly relevant in cases where high-profile individuals stand trial, with the concern that the impartiality of the jury may be compromised by extraneous information, disrupting due process and resulting in an unfair trial.

Etymology and early use 
The concept was popularized for the first time as Trial by Television in response to the 3 February 1967 television broadcast of The Frost Programme, hosted by David Frost. The confrontation and Frost's personal adversarial line of questioning of insurance fraudster Emil Savundra led to concern from ITV executives that it might affect Savundra's right to a fair trial.

Description
During high-publicity court cases, the media are often accused of provoking an atmosphere of public hysteria akin to a lynch mob which not only makes a fair trial nearly impossible but means that regardless of the result of the trial, the accused will not be able to live the rest of their life without intense public scrutiny.

Although a recently coined phrase, the idea that popular media can have a strong influence on the legal process goes back certainly to the development of the printing press and probably much further. This is not including the use of a state-controlled press to criminalize political opponents, but in its commonly understood meaning covers all occasions where the reputation of a person has been drastically affected by ostensibly non-political publications.

Often the coverage in the press can be said to reflect the views of the person in the street. However, more credibility is generally given to printed material than 'water cooler gossip'. The responsibility of the press to confirm reports and leaks about individuals being tried has come under increasing scrutiny and journalists are calling for higher standards. There was much debate over U.S President Bill Clinton's impeachment trial and prosecutor Kenneth Starr's investigation and how the media handled the trial by reporting commentary from lawyers which influenced public opinion.

In the United Kingdom, strict contempt of court regulations restrict the media's reporting of legal proceedings after a person is formally arrested.  These rules are designed so that a defendant receives a fair trial in front of a jury that has not been tainted by prior media coverage. The newspapers the Daily Mirror and The Sun have been prosecuted under these regulations, although such prosecutions are rare. It is also within the power of the courts to prevent the jury from accessing electronic devices during the course of the trial. Furthermore, court security officers are authorized to search for electronic devices that they suspect a juror may have failed to surrender as per the judge's request. Consequently, to conduct research into the case using electronic devices, and indeed share this information with other jurors, is punishable by a fine or imprisonment for up to two years.

Notable events 
In 2015, Jasleen Kaur, a woman from Delhi, India, posted a photo of a man, Sarvjeet Singh, on Facebook and accused him of sexual harassment. The Facebook post went viral which was followed by a media trial labelling the man with terms like 'pervert' and 'the predator of Delhi'. Four years later, the man was found innocent by the Delhi court and was acquitted of all the charges. However, during the time, the man had lost his job and could not find any other source of income due to the media coverage.

See also

 Amanda Knox
 Brett Kavanaugh
 Casey Anthony
 Calciopoli
 Court of public opinion
 Courtroom photography and broadcasting
 Day-care sex-abuse hysteria
 Death of Azaria Chamberlain
 Duke lacrosse case
 Extraordinary Popular Delusions and the Madness of Crowds
 Femme fatale
 Fishing expedition
 Jasleen Kaur harassment controversy
 Karl Muck
 McMartin preschool trial
 Media circus
 Presumption of guilt
 A Rape on Campus
 Richard Jewell
 Richard Ricci
 Sam Sheppard
 Sensationalism
 Trial by ordeal
 Witch-hunt

References

External links
Condemnation of trial by media. Complete text of the judgement by the Andhra Pradesh High Court, India.

English phrases
Influence of mass media
Mass media issues
Mass media events
Media coverage and representation
Privacy
Criticism of journalism
Public opinion